The NASA Outstanding Leadership Medal is awarded to US government employees only for notably outstanding leadership which affects technical or administrative programs of NASA. The leadership award may be given for an act of leadership, for sustained contributions based on a leader's effectiveness, for the productivity of the leader's program, or for the leader's demonstrated ability in developing the administrative or technical talents of other employees.

Recipients

1970 
 James C. Elms
 Robert L. Krieger

1972 
 Leonard Jaffe

1973 
 Donald D. Arabian
 Eugene H. Cagle
 William C. Keathley
 Edwin C. Kilgore
 Eugene F. Kranz
 Robert O. Piland
 Stanley R. Reinartz
 Philip C. Shaffer

1974 
 John R. Casani
 M. P. Frank
 Robert A. Parker

1975 
 Arnold D. Aldrich
 Robert O. Aller
 John P. Donnelly
 Don M. Hartung
 Seymour C. Himmel
 Walter J. Kapryan
 Robert N. Lindley
 Bernard Lubarsky
 Leslie H. Meredith
 John J. Neilon
 William H. Rock
 Robert J. Shafer
 Charles H. Terhune

1976 
 Robert C. Baumann
 Paul C. Donnelly
 Albert G. Ferris
 James J. Kramer
 Charles T. Newman
 Joseph E. Robbins
 Miles Ross
 Michael J. Vaccaro

1977 
 Manuel Bautista Aranda
 Loren G. Bright
 G. Calvin Broome
 Edmund A. Brummer
 Robert L. Crabtree
 John E. Duberg
 E. Barton Geer
 George N. Gianopulos
 Wayne R. Glenny
 Angelo Guastaferro
 Jack E. Harris
 Marshall S. Johnson
 Louis Kingsland
 Robert A. Leslie
 Peter T. Lyman
 William J. O'Neil
 George F. Pieper
 Ronald A. Ploszaj
 James E. Stitt
 Israel Taback
 Allen E. Wolfe
 Howard T. Wright

1978 
 Eugenio Covacevich
 George C. Deutsch
 James A. Downey
 Edmond J. Golden
 Robert E. King
 John A. Manke
 John P. Reeder
 Geoffrey Robillard
 Nancy G. Roman
 Donald K. Slayton
 Fridtjof A. H. Speer

1981 
 John R. Casani

1984 
 H. Robert Lynn
 Richard Sade
 Robert E. Spearing

2000 

 Eileen M. Collins

2006 
 Joel S. Levine

2007 

 Michael Gazarik
 Susan Gorton
 Ajay Kumar
 Laurence Leavitt
 Brenton Weathered

2010 
 Kenneth M. Ford

2011 
 Julie A. Robinson (biologist)

2012 
 Christa Peters-Lidard
Anne R. Douglass

2021 
 Wesley W. Deadrick

See also 
 List of NASA awards

References

External links 
 NASA awards
 National Aeronautics and Space Administration Honor Awards (1969–1978)

Outstanding Leadership Medal